Leonard W.J. van der Kuijp (born September 23, 1952) is a Dutch professor of Tibetan and Himalayan Studies and former chair of the Department of Sanskrit and Indian Studies (now the Department of South Asian Studies) at Harvard University.

Leonard van der Kuijp began his studies in mathematics, but then shifted his attention to Tibet. He received his master's degree at the University of Saskatchewan in Saskatoon, Canada, and his doctorate at the University of Hamburg in Germany.

In 1993 van der Kuijp received the MacArthur Fellowship for "pioneering contributions to the study of Tibetan epistemology, biography and poetry.". Van der Kuijp worked with the Nepal Research Center of the Humboldt University of Berlin and the University of Washington in Seattle. In July 1995 he joined the faculty at Harvard University. In 1999, he founded the Tibetan Buddhist Resource Center (TBRC), together with E. Gene Smith. Van der Kuijp was elected a foreign member of the Royal Netherlands Academy of Arts and Sciences in 2018.

Van der Kuijp focuses his research primarily on the Indo-Tibetan Buddhism, Tibetan Buddhist intellectual history, Tibetan Buddhism and the relations of Tibet to Mongolia and China.

He coauthored An Early Tibetan Survey of Buddhist Literature which was published as volume 64 of the Harvard Oriental Series in 2008.

Journal publications
 van der Kuijp, Leonard W.J. "Phya pa Chos kyi seng  ge's Impact on Tibetan Epistemological Theory." Journal of Indian Philosophy 5 (1978): 355-369.
 van der Kuijp, Leonard W.J. Contributions to the Development of Tibetan Buddhist Epistemology: From the Eleventh to the Thirteenth Century. Wiesbaden: Franz Steiner, 1983.
 van der Kuijp, Leonard W.J. "Studies in the Life and Thought of Mkhas grub rje I: Mkhas grub rje's Epistemological Oeuvre and His Philosophical Remarks on Dignaga's Pramanasamuccaya." Berliner Indologische Studien 1 (1985): 75-105.
 van der Kuijp, Leonard W.J. "On the Sources for Sa skya Paṇḍita's Notes on the Bsam yas Debate." The Journal of the International Association of Buddhist Studies 9.2 (1986): 147-153.
 van der Kuijp, Leonard W.J. "The Abbatial Succession of Gsang phu ne'u thog Monastery from ca.1073 to 1250. " Berliner Indologische Studien 3 (1987), 103-127.
 van der Kuijp, Leonard W.J. Review Article. "On The Lives of Śākyaśrībhadra (?-1225)." Journal of the American Oriental Society 114.4 (1994): 599-616.
 van der Kuijp, Leonard W.J. "Some Remarks on the Textual Transmission and Text of Bu ston Rin chen grub's Chos 'byung, a Chronicle of Buddhism in India and Tibet." Revue d'Études Tibétaines 25 (2013): 111-89.

References

External links
Biography on TBRC 

1952 births
Living people
Dutch expatriates in the United States
Dutch orientalists
Harvard University faculty
Linguists from the Netherlands
MacArthur Fellows
Tibetologists
Members of the Royal Netherlands Academy of Arts and Sciences
University of Hamburg alumni
University of Saskatchewan alumni